Rabrovac is a village situated in Mladenovac municipality in Serbia.

References

Suburbs of Belgrade